BlueCrest Capital Management is a British-American hedge fund which was founded by British billionaire Michael Platt and  American William Reeves in 2000. The New York City-based company has registered offices in Geneva, Singapore, and elsewhere.  BlueCrest Capital Management is Europe’s third-biggest hedge-fund firm, managing over £30 billion. The firm's employees are estimated to number 600.

It also operates as Bluecrest Recruitment, BlueCrest Inc,
BlueCrest Capital Management, Limited, and BlueCrest UK. Until 2014 it was BlueCrest Capital Management, LLP. It has a flagship fund BlueCrest Capital International Master Fund Limited, and a US fund BlueCrest Capital L.P.

Investments 
In 2014, Bluecrest spun off $8.2 billion worth of assets into a new company, Systematica Investments, run by Bluecrest employee, Leda Braga. CNBC has referred to Braga as "the most powerful woman in Hedge Funds", earning in excess of $50 million annually.

In 2015, Bluecrest announced its plans to return all outside capital to investors and transition into a private investment partnership that would manage money for its partners and employees.

The fund generated returns of 50% in 2016, 54% in 2017, 25% in 2018 when the average hedge fund lost money, and 50% in 2019.

In March 2020, BlueCrest reduced the size of its relative-value trading book, which seeks to exploit anomalies in related securities. The company also cut risk across the firm by about $1 billion. BlueCrest suffered some losses after the sell-off, but the investment fund was up for the year through the close of trading on March 11.

On Dec 8, 2020, The Securities and Exchange Commission announced that UK-based investment adviser BlueCrest Capital Management Limited has agreed to pay $170 million to settle charges arising from inadequate disclosures, material misstatements, and misleading omissions concerning its transfer of top traders from its flagship client fund, BlueCrest Capital International (BCI), to a proprietary fund, BSMA Limited, and replacement of those traders with an underperforming algorithm.

References

External links
 BlueCrest Capital Management homepage

Financial services companies of the United States
Financial services companies based in New York City
Financial services companies established in 2000
2000 establishments in New York City
Companies established in 2000
Hedge funds
American companies established in 2000
2000 establishments in the United States
Companies based in New York City